Angga may refer to:

 Angga Dwimas Sasongko (born 1985), Indonesian film director
 Angga Pratama (born 1991), Indonesian badminton player
 Angga Febryanto Putra (born 1995), Indonesian professional footballer
 Angga Saputra (born 1993), Indonesian professional footballer
 Gilang Angga (born 1980), Indonesian footballer
 Jaya Teguh Angga (born 1987), Indonesian footballer

See also 
 Anggun (born 1974), Indonesian female singer
 Anga Kingdom, in the eastern parts of India
 Angga railway station, a station on the Chinese Qingzang Railway